EMC Elastic Cloud Storage (ECS), formerly Project Nile, is an object storage software product marketed by EMC Corporation. ECS was designed to adhere to several tenets of object storage, including scalability, data resiliency and cost effectiveness. It is marketed as software-defined storage.

Applications 
EMC Elastic Cloud Storage has a number of applications, including the Internet of things and financial services, where it was determined by Cohasset Associates Inc. to meet "the relevant storage requirements of SEC Rule 17a-4(f) and CFTC Rule 1.31(b)-(c)" when "Compliance is enabled for a Namespace and when properly configured and utilized to store and retain records in non-erasable and non-rewriteable format." Its use of object storage and flat namespace, according to the Edison Group, "allows for multiple types of data to be stored side by side. Regardless of the data, it is all viewed as object, their globally unique IDs, and metadata." This approach allows multiple data types from multiple sources to be stored alongside one another, including:
 Large data sets: Financial, pharmaceutical, geospatial, biotech, and legal
 Public data sets: Weather, government
 Security, imagery, and social media: Images, videos, blogs
 Revenue chain data: Sensors, devices, Internet of Things.

ECS was mentioned in a marketing vendor assessment for object storage in 2014. (Note: EMC’s bubble size is reflective of only ECS.)

References

Computer storage companies
Storage Area Network companies